John Cale: Inside the Dream Syndicate Volume 2, Dream Interpretation, a.k.a. simply Dream Interpretation, is an album by John Cale from his tenure with the Theatre of Eternal Music. It is the second in a loose anthology of minimalist pieces, once thought lost, compiled from the tape collection of fellow minimalist Tony Conrad. The album follows Cale's debut collection Sun Blindness Music and the collaborative bootleg Day of Niagara. Dream Interpretation was in turn followed by Stainless Gamelan.

Track listing
"Dream Interpretation" - 20:35
"Ex-Cathedra" - 5:05
"[Untitled] For Piano" - 12:30
"Carousel" - 2:34
"A Midnight Rain of Green Wrens at the World's Tallest Building" - 3:21
"Hot Scoria" - 9:21

Personnel
John Cale – viola, Vox Continental organ, piano, electronic sounds, guitar
Tony Conrad – violin
Angus MacLise – cimbalom

References

Minimalistic compositions
John Cale compilation albums
Theatre of Eternal Music albums
2002 compilation albums